Cyllodes is a genus of sap-feeding beetles in the family Nitidulidae. There are about 14 described species in Cyllodes.

Species
These 14 species belong to the genus Cyllodes:

 Cyllodes accentus Kirejtshuk, 1985
 Cyllodes ater (Herbst, 1792)
 Cyllodes bifascies (Walker, 1859)
 Cyllodes biplagiatus LeConte, 1866
 Cyllodes criptum Kirejtshuk, 2005
 Cyllodes literatus (Reitter, 1878)
 Cyllodes multimaculatus Grouvelle, 1913
 Cyllodes nakanei Hisamatsu, 1961
 Cyllodes pseudoliteratus Kirejtshuk, 2005
 Cyllodes punctidorsum Nakane & Hisamatsu, 1955
 Cyllodes quinquemaculatus Liu, Yang & Huang, 2016
 Cyllodes thomasi Cline & Skelley
 Cyllodes tigrinus Grouvelle, 1913
 Cyllodes trigrinus Grouvelle, 1913

References

Further reading

External links

 

Nitidulidae
Articles created by Qbugbot